David Sutch may refer to:

 Screaming Lord Sutch (David Edward Sutch, 1940–1999), English musician and politician
 David Sutch (priest) (born 1947), Archdeacon of Gibraltar